This is the list of Egyptian football transfers for the summer of 2022. The window closed on October 10, 2022 which witnessed the conclusion of the largest number of deals in the history of the top division.

Al Ahly 

In:

Out:

Aswan

Ceramica Cleopatra

El Dakhleya

ENPPI

Future 

In:

Out:

Ghazl El Mahalla 

In:

Out:

Haras El Hodoud

Ismaily 

In:

Out:

Al Ittihad

Al Masry

Al Mokawloon Al Arab

National Bank

Pharco

Pyramids 

In:

Out:

Smouha 

In:

Out:

Tala'ea El Gaish

Zamalek 

In:

Out:

See also

 2022–23 Egyptian Premier League

References 

Football transfers summer 2022
Trans